Octorad is a term coined to describe a style of stadium architecture in the late 1960s. The term suggests eight radiuses, the design incorporating four arcs of a large circle to comprise most of the structure, and four arcs of a smaller circle to round out the corners. It was a variant on the archetypal multi-purpose stadiums of the time, many of which were either conventionally circular or oval, and were often criticized for poor sight line angles for many spectators at baseball and football games.

The most prominent examples of the octorad style were San Diego Stadium in San Diego, which opened in 1967 and was demolished in 2021; and Veterans Stadium in Philadelphia, which opened in 1971 and was demolished in 2004.

Both stadiums accomplished the goal of providing better sight lines for spectators. However, the architecture of those two stadiums still put a large majority of the fans far away from the action.

Other terms sometimes used for this design were "super circle" and "square circle".

External links
Further info on Qualcomm Stadium
Further info on Veterans Stadium

Stadiums